The 1969 Men's National Tennis League (NTL) was the final edition of the tour founded by George MacCall the league and players contracts were bought by World Championship Tennis. The tour started in Orlando, United States, 12 February and finished in Cologne, West Germany, 20 October 1969.

Legend

Calendar
This is the complete schedule of events on the 1969 National Tennis League, with player progression partially documented until the quarterfinals stage.

February

March

August

October

Prize money rankings
Source:

See also
 1969 World Championship Tennis circuit
 Grand Prix tennis tournaments
 USTA
 International Tennis Federation

References

Attribution
This article contains some copied text from the article National Tennis League

Sources
 MacCambridge, Michael (2012). Lamar Hunt: A Life in Sports. Andrews McMeel Publishing. .
 
 Robertson, Max (1974). Encyclopaedia of Tennis. Allen & Unwin. .

External links
 https://app.thetennisbase.com/1969 Season Main tournaments

National Tennis League
Men's National Tennis League